Aga Fall is a waterfall on the River Yei in the Wudabi payam of Morobo County in Central Equatoria, South Sudan.

A plan was announced in 2011, by the Central Equatoria State Government under the leadership of former Governor Clement Wani Konga, to build a power plant on the Aga Falls to supply power to Greater Yei which includes counties of Morobo, Yei, Lainya, and Kajo-Keji.

References 

Central Equatoria
Waterfalls of South Sudan